Petter Pedersen can refer to:

 Petter Pedersen (footballer), a Norwegian footballer
 Petter Mørland Pedersen, a Norwegian sailor

See also
Peder Pedersen (disambiguation)
Peter Pedersen (disambiguation)